The Standards of Lending Practice (previously the Lending Code) are voluntary and set the benchmark for good lending practice in the United Kingdom, outlining the way registered firms are expected to deal with their customers throughout the entire product life cycle.

The Standards of Lending Practice for personal customers covers loans, credit cardis, charge cards and overdrafts. The Standards of Lending Practice for business customers covers loans, credit cards, charge cards and overdrafts, with a separate set of Standards covering asset finance.

Each section of the Standards contains:

 A customer outcome;
 An overall statement of how a firm intends to achieve this outcome; and
 A detailed set of standards that demonstrate the approach.

While a number of these outcomes are well established within firms, new areas do emerge from time to time. As and when they do, the Standards of Lending Practice will evolve to help registered firms develop their approach to them.

References

 The Standards
 The Standards for personal customers 
 The Standards for business customers
 Other voluntary standards

External links
 Lending Standards Board

Banking in the United Kingdom